21st Circuitry was a record label based in San Francisco, California, that was founded in early 1991. The label released music from genres, such as electro-industrial, industrial rock, and other similar styles of music. The label signed a number of artists, including, Covenant, Unit:187, and Xorcist, as well as releasing a number of compilation albums targeted at the industrial scene. Some releases were distributed via other labels, including Caroline Records and Metropolis Records. In 1999, 21st Circuitry shut its doors and its remaining stock was purchased by Metropolis Records.

Notable artists
 Covenant
 Hate Dept.
 Luxt
 Mute Angst Envy
 New Mind
 Scar Tissue
 Templebeat

Compilations
 Death Rave 2000 (1993)
 Death Rave 2010 (1994)
 Coldwave Breaks (1995)
 21st Circuitry Shox (1996)
 The Remix Wars: Strike 1 - :Wumpscut: Vs. Haujobb
 The Remix Wars: Strike 3 - 16 Volt Vs. Hate Dept.
 Newer Wave (1997)
 Coldwave Breaks II (1997)
 Newer Wave 2.0 (1998)
 21st Circuitry Shox 2 (1998)

References

External links
Discogs
Allmusic

See also
 List of record labels
 Metropolis Records

American record labels
Record labels established in 1991
Record labels disestablished in 1999
Industrial record labels
1991 establishments in California